Adam William Herbert, Jr. (born December 1, 1943) is an American retired academic administrator. He served as president of the University of North Florida from 1989 to 1998, as chancellor of the State University System of Florida from 1998 to 2001, and as president of Indiana University from 2003 to 2007. He was the first African-American to hold the latter two positions. He announced his retirement from Indiana University in 2007, and was succeeded by Michael McRobbie.

Early years
Born in Muskogee, Oklahoma, he and his sister Tamashia Buckner were raised by their mother Addie Hibler Herbert a divorcee. Herbert attended Manual Training High School. Herbert's mother was a teacher and librarian and a strong influence on him. He has called her his personal hero.  Herbert earned a Bachelor of Arts in political science (1966) and a Master of Public Administration (1968) from the University of Southern California. He earned his Ph.D. in urban affairs and public administration from the University of Pittsburgh in 1971.

Academic career and service in Florida

Herbert's academic career started at University of Southern California as a faculty member in the School of Public Administration and the Center for Urban Affairs. In 1972 he became the chair of urban affairs program and associate professor of urban affairs at the Virginia Polytechnic Institute and State University (Virginia Tech). Herbert also held academic appointments in political science and public administration at the University of North Florida; Florida International University, where he was dean of the School of Public Affairs and Services and vice president for academic affairs; the University of Southern California; Howard University; and the University of Pittsburgh. He is a member of the National Academy of Public Administration (NAPA) and has served two terms as a member of its board of trustees. His research focuses on the politics of higher education and on the policy, political and administrative challenges of enhancing public education from pre-kindergarten through higher education, with particular emphasis on issues that impact low income and minority communities.

In 1974, he became one of 15 White House Fellows in the Ford Administration. He served as special assistant to the U.S. Secretary of Health, Education and Welfare. Following the fellowship year he served as special assistant to the U.S. Undersecretary of Housing and Urban Development and subsequently as director of research for the Joint Center for Political Studies in Washington, DC.

Herbert served as president of the National Association of Schools of Public Affairs and Administration. He is a member of the Knight Foundation Commission on Intercollegiate Athletics and chaired the National Collegiate Athletic Association's Division II Presidents Council. He was chair of the Jacksonville Chamber of Commerce in 1993. He has served as a Florida Commissioner on the Education Commission of States and is a member of the Florida Federal Judicial Nominating Commission.

Herbert served as Regents Professor at the University of North Florida and founding executive director of the influential Florida Center for Public Policy and Leadership. He served as president of the university from 1989 to 1998. Adam W. Herbert, an outstanding educator and inspirational leader who was the third president of the University of North Florida. From 1998 to 2000, Herbert was the sixth chancellor of the State University System of Florida, the second-largest university system in America. During his tenure, Dr. Herbert increased enrollment, enhanced academic quality, greatly expanded the campus, fostered a caring and nurturing learning environment and built lasting bridges to the community. One such bridge included securing the funding and overseeing the design and construction of this conference center open to the university, the community and area businesses.
UNF experienced unprecedented growth under Dr. Herbert's leadership, exceeding the 10,000-student level in 1995. He also fostered community partnerships resulting in a significant increase in private funding to supplement state appropriations. During his time as UNF president, he was chairman of the Jacksonville Regional Chamber of Commerce and co-chair of NFL Now, a successful community initiative to bring a National Football League team to Jacksonville. Following his UNF service, he was named chancellor of the State University System of Florida, the second-largest university system in America.
Returning to UNF in 2000, Dr. Herbert became the founding executive director of The Florida Center for Public Policy and Leadership. The center was a manifestation of Dr. Herbert's longstanding interest in public service. Early in his career, he was selected as one of 15 White House Fellows and served as special assistant to the U.S. Secretary of Health, Education and Welfare. He also was special assistant to the U.S. Undersecretary of Housing and Urban Development and director of research for the Joint Center for Political Studies in Washington, D.C.

In 2003, Dr. Herbert was selected as the 16th president of Indiana University, leading the eight-campus system until 2007.

When Dr. Herbert retired, he and his wife Karen returned to Jacksonville.

Adam W. Herbert University Center
In  October 2013, a community center at UNF was dedicated to Dr. Herbert.  The Adam W. Herbert University Center was dedicated as part of the annual Founders Day celebration. Herbert was recognized for his vision in building a facility that has done double-duty serving the community and the university.	

Since opening in 1999, the University Center has compiled impressive attendance numbers. University Center Director George Androuin estimates the center has hosted more than 54,000 activities and attracted 2.2 million visitors in its lifetime. When many of these event participants visited the University Center, it was their first exposure to UNF, a success in terms of Herbert's goal to raise the profile of the university in the community.
These figures also include separate events sponsored by the Division Continuing Education, the Florida Small Business Development Center and the Institute of Police Technology and Management, all of which have offices in the facility.
The attendance numbers substantiate Herbert's "if you build it, they will come" philosophy. At the groundbreaking, he said it was clear to him there were few alternatives to the convention center in downtown Jacksonville especially for smaller conferences, meetings and lectures.  Construction of the 95,000-square-foot facility began in 1997 and proceeded rapidly. By February 1999, it was ready for its grand opening.
Although Herbert had become chancellor of the State University System by the time the Center opened, he had many opportunities to view its operations in subsequent years. He returned to UNF in 2000 to become the founding executive director of The Florida Center for Public Policy and Leadership 
Now, retired and living in Jacksonville, he is a frequent visitor for lectures and special events at the center.

Herbert through the years:
1989: Adam W. Herbert named the University of North Florida's third president.

1993: Herbert oversees a year of growth at UNF, including the opening of the UNF arena and groundbreaking for the College of Health. UNF also joined the NCAA Division II that year.

1997: Herbert directs the New Century Commission on Education for changing the Duval County schools.

January 1998: Herbert becomes chancellor of Florida's State University System.

November 1998: Herbert leads Gov. Jeb Bush's election transition team.

March 2001:   Directs the Florida Center for Public Policy and Leadership Development at UNF.

Leadership at Indiana University

On June 6, 2003, Herbert was selected to be IU's 17th president, his term began on August 1, 2003. Upon assuming leadership of Indiana University, one of Herbert's biggest initiatives focused on "mission differentiation" for IU's eight campuses, which included making the flagship Bloomington campus more selective. Under the proposal Indiana University Bloomington would have educated the professionals, executives and researchers while the regional campuses would be tasked with educating the labor force. In his inaugural address, IU's 17th president noted that "the opportunity before us is to shape and lay the stones that will serve as the foundation for expansions and additions, new spires and buttresses of this magnificent cathedral of learning." He did so by overseeing transformative initiatives in teaching, research, and public engagement. Under his direction, the faculty instituted a general education curriculum, and brought more than $1.7 billion to Indiana in research grants and contracts.  He oversaw the development of the Indiana Life Sciences Initiative, designed to establish IU as one of the nation's leading centers of life sciences research and Indiana as a leader in the life sciences industry. He helped each of IU's eight campuses become more market smart and mission centered by launching the Mission Differentiation initiative and enhanced IU's relationships with Indiana's community colleges. He undertook the university's first major administrative restructuring in 30 years, expanded IU's physical infrastructure through the construction or renovation of more than 3,000,000 square feet of university facilities, and significantly strengthened the university's athletics programs. Throughout his presidency, Adam Herbert placed special emphasis on fund raising, particularly in the area of student financial aid. He also enthusiastically promoted diversity in IU's faculty, staff and student body, challenging each IU campus to develop concrete diversity goals.

Post IU post
Herbert served on the transition team of Mayor-elect of Jacksonville Alvin Brown.

References

External links
 Indiana University Finding Aid - President Adam W. Herbert speeches, 2003-08.

1943 births
Living people
20th-century African-American people
21st-century African-American people
Academics from Oklahoma
African-American educators
Chancellors of the State University System of Florida
Educators from Oklahoma
Presidents of Indiana University
Presidents of the University of North Florida
University of Pittsburgh alumni
University of Southern California alumni
USC Sol Price School of Public Policy alumni